Vitaly Zhukovsky (Vital' Zhukowski; ; born 17 May 1984) is a Belarusian professional football coach and a former player. Between 2010 and 2020, he worked as a head coach at Isloch Minsk Raion. In 2021 he was in charge of BATE Borisov.

Career
Zhukovsky's playing career was cut short in late 2002 by a serious injury sustained while playing for the BATE Borisov reserve squad. After spending several years outside football, in 2010 he joined Isloch Minsk Raion, which at the time was an amateur team playing in Minsk Oblast league. Eventually Zhukovsky led Isloch to a series of promotions, leading to their debut in Belarusian Premier League in 2016.

References

External links
 

Living people
1984 births
Association football midfielders
Belarusian footballers
FC BATE Borisov players
Belarusian football managers
Belarusian expatriate football managers
Expatriate football managers in Kazakhstan
FC BATE Borisov managers
FC Isloch Minsk Raion managers
FC Atyrau managers